Corigliano Calabro is a town and a frazione of Corigliano-Rossano  located in the province of Cosenza, c. 40 km northeast of the city of Cosenza, in Calabria, southern Italy.

Geography
It is situated near the mouth of a river of the same name, and contains an aqueduct. On an eminence overlooking the town is a feudal castle with massive towers and a deep trench.
 
In the comune are the ruins of the ancient city of Thurii, a former bishopric which remains a Latin titular see as Thurio. Nearby is Sibari, the site of the ancient city of Sybaris.

History 
In 1879, it had a population of about 13,000. It had five churches, six convents, and a few public buildings. Licorice was made on a large scale, and there was a considerable trade in timber, wine, oranges, lemons and olives.

People
Gennaro Gattuso, Italian footballer 
Costantino Mortati, Italian constitutionalist
Francesco Pianeta, boxer
Gino Renni, actor, comedian and singer
Francesco Serra, father of Brazilian politician José Serra
Elsa Serrano, fashion designer
Vincenzo Tieri, journalist, writer, playwright
Aroldo Tieri, actor, son of the former

References

Sources